Jesse Reed may refer to:

 Jesse Reed, friend of Kurt Cobain
 Jesse Reed, Principal Chiefs of the Cherokee

See also
Jesse Reid, boxer
Jessie Reid, baseball player